Triangular trade or triangle trade is trade between three ports or regions. Triangular trade usually evolves when a region has export commodities that are not required in the region from which its major imports come. It has been used to offset trade imbalances between different regions.

The Atlantic slave trade used a system of three-way trans-Atlantic exchanges – known historically as the triangular trade – which operated between Europe, Africa, and the Americas from the 16th to 19th centuries. A classic example is the colonial molasses trade, which involved the circuitous trading of slaves, sugar (often in liquid form, as molasses), and rum between West Africa, the West Indies and the northern colonies of British North America in the 17th and 18th centuries. The slaves grew the sugar that was used to brew rum, which in turn was traded for more slaves. In this circuit, the sea lane west from Africa to the West Indies (and later, also to Brazil) was known as the Middle Passage; its cargo consisted of abducted or recently purchased African slaves.

During the Age of Sail, the particular routes were also shaped by the powerful influence of winds and currents.  For example, from the main trading nations of Western Europe, it was much easier to sail westwards after first going south of 30° N latitude and reaching the so-called "trade winds", thus arriving in the Caribbean rather than going straight west to the North American mainland. Returning from North America, it was easiest to follow the Gulf Stream in a northeasterly direction using the westerlies. (Even before the voyages of Christopher Columbus, the Portuguese had been using a similar triangle to sail to the Canary Islands and the Azores, and it was then expanded outwards.)

Atlantic triangular slave trade

The most historically significant triangular trade was the transatlantic slave trade which operated between Europe, Africa, and the Americas from the 16th to 19th centuries. Slave ships would leave European ports (such as Bristol and Nantes) and sail to African ports loaded with goods manufactured in Europe. There, the slave traders would purchase enslaved Africans by exchanging the goods, then sail to the Americas via the Middle Passage to sell their enslaved cargo in European colonies. Afterwards, the slave ship would sail back to Europe to begin the cycle again. The enslaved Africans were primarily purchased for the purpose of working on plantations to work producing valuable cash crops (such as sugar, cotton, and tobacco) which were in high demand in Europe. Slave traders from European colonies would occasionally travel to Africa themselves, eliminating the European portion of the voyage. 

A classic example is the colonial molasses trade. Merchants purchased raw sugar (often in its liquid form, molasses) from plantations in the Caribbean and shipped it to New England and Europe, where it was sold to distillery companies that produced rum. Merchant capitalists used cash from the sale of sugar to purchase rum, furs, and lumber in New England which their crews shipped to Europe. With the profits from the European sales, merchants purchased Europe's manufactured goods, including tools and weapons and on the next leg, shipped those manufactured goods, along with the American sugar and rum, to West Africa where they bartered the goods for slaves seized by local potentates. The crews then transported the slaves to the Caribbean and sold them to sugar plantation owners. The cash from the sale of slaves in Brazil, the Caribbean islands, and the American South used to buy more raw materials, restarting the cycle. The full triangle trip took a calendar year on average, according to historian Clifford Shipton.

The first leg of the triangle was from a European port to one in West Africa (then known as the "Slave Coast"), in which ships carried supplies for sale and trade, such as copper, cloth, trinkets, slave beads, guns and ammunition.  When the ship arrived, its cargo would be sold or bartered for slaves. Ports that exported these enslaved people from Africa include Ouidah, Lagos, Aného (Little Popo), Grand-Popo, Agoué, Jakin, Porto-Novo, and Badagry. These ports traded slaves who were supplied from African communities, tribes and kingdoms, including the Alladah and Ouidah, which were later taken over by the Dahomey kingdom. 

On the second leg, ships made the journey of the Middle Passage from Africa to the New World. Many slaves died of disease in the crowded holds of the slave ships. Once the ship reached the New World, enslaved survivors were sold in the Caribbean or the American colonies. The ships were then prepared to get them thoroughly cleaned, drained, and loaded with export goods for a return voyage, the third leg, to their home port, from the West Indies the main export cargoes were sugar, rum, and molasses; from Virginia, tobacco and hemp. The ship then returned to Europe to complete the triangle.

The triangle route was not generally followed by individual ships. Slave ships were built to carry large numbers of people, rather than cargo, and variations in the duration of the Atlantic crossing meant that they often arrived in the Americas out-of-season. Slave ships thus often returned to their home port carrying whatever goods were readily available in the Americas but with a large part or all of their capacity with ballast. Cash crops were transported mainly by a separate fleet which only sailed from Europe to the Americas and back. In his books, Herbert S. Klein has argued that in many fields (cost of trade, ways of transport, mortality levels, earnings and benefits of trade for the Europeans and the "so-called triangular trade"), the non-scientific literature portrays a situation which the contemporary historiography refuted a long time ago.

A 2017 study provides evidence for the hypothesis that the export of gunpowder to Africa increased the transatlantic slave trade: "A one percent increase in gunpowder set in motion a 5-year gun-slave cycle that increased slave exports by an average of 50%, and the impact continued to grow over time."

New England

New England also made rum from Caribbean sugar and molasses, which it shipped to Africa as well as within the New World.  Yet, the "triangle trade" as considered in relation to New England was a piecemeal operation. No New England traders are known to have completed a sequential circuit of the full triangle, which took a calendar year on average, according to historian Clifford Shipton. The concept of the New England Triangular trade was first suggested, inconclusively, in an 1866 book by George H. Moore, was picked up in 1872 by historian George C. Mason, and reached full consideration from a lecture in 1887 by American businessman and historian William B. Weeden.

Newport and Bristol, Rhode Island, were major ports involved in the colonial triangular slave trade. Many significant Newport merchants and traders participated in the trade, working closely with merchants and traders in the Caribbean and Charleston, South Carolina.

Statistics

According to research provided by Emory University as well as Henry Louis Gates Jr., an estimated 12.5 million slaves were transported from Africa to colonies in North and South America.  The website Voyages: The Trans-Atlantic Slave Trade Database assembles data regarding past trafficking in slaves from Africa.  It shows that the top four nations were Portugal, Great Britain, France, and Spain.

Other triangular trades
The term "triangular trade" also refers to a variety of other trades.
 A triangular trade is hypothesized to have taken place among ancient East Greece (and possibly Attica), Kommos, and Egypt.
 A trade pattern which evolved before the American Revolutionary War among Great Britain, the Colonies of British North America, and British colonies in the Caribbean.  This typically involved exporting raw resources, such as fish (especially salt cod), agricultural produce or lumber, from British North American colonies to slaves and planters in the West Indies; sugar and molasses from the Caribbean; and various manufactured commodities from Great Britain.
 The shipment of Newfoundland salt cod and corn from Boston in British vessels to southern Europe. This also included the shipment of wine and olive oil to Britain.
 A new "sugar triangle" developed in the 1820s and 1830s whereby American ships took local produce to Cuba, then brought sugar or coffee from Cuba to the Baltic coast (Russian Empire and Sweden), then bar iron and hemp back to New England.

See also
History of opium in China
Mercantilism
North Atlantic triangle
Transatlantic relations

Notes

External links

 The Transatlantic Slave Trade Database, a portal to data concerning the history of the triangular trade of transatlantic slave trade voyages.
 Report of the Brown University Steering Committee on Slavery and Justice

History of the Atlantic Ocean
Sea lanes
Slavery in North America
History of sugar
African slave trade
Age of Sail